The Georgia–Georgia National Guard Partnership is one of 25 European partnerships that make up the U.S. European Command State Partnership Program and one of 88 worldwide partnerships that make-up the National Guard State Partnership Program. The Georgia National Guard has maintained a strong State Partnership program with the Republic of Georgia since 1994. Since then, Georgia has put itself on the path of acceptance into NATO, in large part due to the State Partnership Program.

The contributions of the Georgian Armed Forces to the Global War on Terrorism have been remarkable, with Georgia National Guard soldiers having fought side-by-side with Georgian Soldiers in Iraq and Afghanistan. In 2010 alone, the Georgia National Guard helped train over 2,000 Georgian Soldiers, which is one of the reasons that the Republic of Georgia continues to serve as the largest non-NATO nation provider of troops to International Security Assistance Force.

History

When the Georgia-Georgia Partnership began in 1994, the Republic of Georgia expressed considerable fascination with the command and organizational structure of the U.S. National Guard. With their numerous requests for information, the newly independent nation made it clear that they were interested in copying it. "They were very interested in civilian control of the military, how the military establishment fits within the overall structure of government, and the constitutional provisions we have for the National Guard," said BG Thomas L. McCullough, then Commander of the Georgia Army National Guard. "I think it's new to them, but it is something they seem to find intriguing. They were very interested in anything that deals with democracy and democratization of their system."

In 2011, the SPP enabled the Georgian government to complete a presidential initiative to develop a national military service academy. The David Aghmashenebeli National Defense Academy was established in the fall of 2011, and it now serves as the primary commissioning source and critical enabler for force transformation and professionalization – a strategic priority for the country of Georgia. The SPP was involved from the inception, providing conduits to U.S. military academies for guidance and laying the groundwork for mutual collaboration with North Georgia College and State University. A memorandum of understanding was signed between the two universities stating, "The cooperation between the parties shall be implemented to develop civilian and military curricula, internal quality assurance procedures and mechanisms. They will implement student and academic staff exchange programs and other joint activities." The disaster response/interagency coordination efforts within the SPP reached two major milestones in 2011. In June, Georgia conducted a large, Georgian-led exercise with a U.S. observer controller team. The purpose of this exercise was to provide a forum to the Georgian military and  civilian ministries to work together toward a common solution. This successful exercise is the culmination of over five years of bilateral efforts. The Georgians now have viable interagency partner capacity and the confidence to demonstrate it. In November 2011, the Georgian Ministry of Internal Affairs volunteered to host the 2012 NATO Euro-Atlantic Disaster Response Coordination Center's annual disaster response exercise. This exercise included 38 countries and over 1,000 participants, allowing Georgia to showcase their partner capacity.

In 2012, the SPP program continued supporting the annual event SHARED HORIZONS, a U.S. European Command directed exercise conducted by United States Army Europe. The exercise is designed to help the Republic of Georgia government
provide civil response in the event of a natural or manmade disaster. The 2012 event saw about 12 Georgia Army Guardsmen and 25 USAREUR personnel working alongside 100 Georgian government officials at the Georgian National Guard Training Center. The Georgian Ministry of Internal Affairs and Ministry of Defense are leading the exercise. "What's learned during these four days will help them better mitigate public suffering in the event the real thing ever happens," said Georgia Army Guard Col. Anthony Abbott, Shared Horizons 2012 exercise director. "In addition, the Georgians will be equipped and trained to respond better to the questions civilian media will ask."

References

External links

The EUCOM State Partnership page for Georgia-Georgia
Department of Defense News on the Georgia-Georgia Partnership
EUCOM SPP
National Guard Bureau SPP
National Guard Bureau SPP News Archives

Georgia (country)–United States military relations
Georgia National Guard
Military alliances involving the United States